Ambernath (Marathi pronunciation: [əmbəɾnaːt̪ʰ]) is an eastern suburban city in Mumbai and is a part of the Mumbai Metropolitan Region.

Notable people 
 Merwyn Fernandes, former Indian hockey player
Farukh Choudhary, Indian footballer
Puranik Yogendra, politician.
Kay Kay Menon, actor.

References 

 
Cities and towns in Thane district
Talukas in Maharashtra
Cities in Maharashtra